Fyokla Ignatievna Bezzubova (27 September 1880 in Saransky Uyezd – 12 May 1966 in Saransk) was a Soviet Russian writer of folklore. A member of the Union of Soviet Writers since 1938, she was invested with the Order of the Red Banner of Labour in 1939, the Order of the Badge of Honour in 1950, and the Medal "For Valiant Labour in the Great Patriotic War 1941–1945" in 1947.

She collected Folk Songs. 

In 1947, she was a deputy of the Supreme Soviet of the Mordovian Autonomous Soviet Socialist Republic.

Works 

 "Folk Morot" ( "Folk Songs" ) 1939
 Skazt dy Morot” ( “Tales and Songs” ) 1958

References 

1880 births
1966 deaths
Soviet writers
Folklore writers